Gastão José Ministro Elias (born 24 November 1990) is a Portuguese professional tennis player, who competes on the ATP World Tour. He became the fifth Portuguese tennis player to break into the top 100 of the Association of Tennis Professionals singles rankings. In October 2016, he reached a career-high singles ranking of world No. 57 to become the second-highest-ranked Portuguese player, after João Sousa (No. 28).

Early and personal life 
Gastão Elias was born on 24 November 1990 in Caldas da Rainha, Portugal. At age four, he started playing tennis with his father. In 2001, he participated in the national under-12 singles competition, falling to future Davis Cup partner João Sousa in the semifinals. Elias idolized James Blake and Roger Federer while growing up. He is a supporter of Sporting Clube de Portugal, Real Madrid C.F. and Liverpool F.C.

Career

Professional career
2016 proved to be a breakthrough year for Elias. After winning an ATP Challenger Tour tournament in Turin by defeating Enrique López-Pérez in three sets and earning position in the top 100, being ranked no. 94, Elias continued capitalizing on his Challenger Tour success as he won his sixth Challenger title in Mestre, Italy by defeating Horacio Zeballos in straight sets. In July 2016, Elias made his first splash on ATP World Tour tournament level in Bastad, Sweden after defeating Christian Lindell, Taro Daniel, and pulling an upset against compatriot João Sousa on his way to his first ATP World Tour semifinal. However, in the semifinals, Elias lost to Fernando Verdasco. Later in July 2016, Elias participated in another ATP World Tour tournament in Umag, Croatia. Elias defeated Guillermo Garcia-Lopez in the round of 32 and then pulled one of the biggest upsets of the tournament by defeating top seeded Pablo Cuevas in a close encounter. That win marked Elias' first win over a top-20 player. Elias then defeated Pablo Carreño Busta and reached his second consecutive ATP World Tour semifinal, where he lost to Fabio Fognini in straight sets.

Playing style
Gastão Elias is offensive baseliner who puts focus on hitting hard and accurate groundstrokes to push his opponents and hitting winners, however also making comparable to winners amount of unforced errors. His serve and forehand shot are dangerous weapons, which are the main instruments in winning points, but return game is one of the weaknesses, which can be exploited by the best players whose game heavily based on strong serve and volley tactic. While feeling most comfortable at the baseline Elias makes occasional runs to the net, though these runs can't be classified as the key aspect of his game. Although his favourite surface is hard, most of his success came on clay.

Challenger and Futures/World Tennis Tour finals

Singles: 33 (16–17)

Doubles: 6 (2 titles, 4 runners-up)

Performance timelines

Singles
Current through the 2022 Davis Cup.

1Held as Hamburg Masters (outdoor clay) until 2008, Madrid Masters (outdoor clay) 2009–present.

Doubles

Wins over top 10 players

Singles
Elias has a 1–1 win–loss career record against ATP top 10-ranked players.

Head-to-head against top 20 players
This section contains Elias's win–loss record against players who have been ranked 20th or higher in the world rankings during their careers.

Career earnings

* As of 10 April 2017

National participation

Davis Cup (13 wins, 17 losses)
Elias debuted for the Portugal Davis Cup team in 2007 and has played 30 matches in 16 ties. His singles record is 6–8 and his doubles record is 7–9 (13–17 overall).

   indicates the result of the Davis Cup match followed by the score, date, place of event, the zonal classification and its phase, and the court surface.

References

External links
 
 
 

1990 births
Living people
People from Caldas da Rainha
Sportspeople from Bradenton, Florida
Portuguese expatriates in the United States
Portuguese male tennis players
Tennis people from Florida
Tennis players at the 2016 Summer Olympics
Olympic tennis players of Portugal
21st-century Portuguese people